Meri Wilson Edgmon (June 15, 1949 – December 28, 2002), known professionally as Meri Wilson, was an American singer best known for singing double entendre novelty songs.

Personal history
She was born in Nagoya, Japan, at a United States military base, but raised in Marietta, Georgia, United States. She came from a musical family.

She earned a BS in music at Indiana University's Jacobs School of Music, and received a master's degree in music education at Georgia State University. She moved to Dallas, Texas in the 1970s. Initially a guitar soloist, she later fronted a trio in such popular clubs as Daddy's Money, Arthur's, and Papillion.

After a car accident in 1975, she was forced to wear a body cast for months. After her recovery, she began performing at a club in Underground Atlanta and made ends meet by working as a model and singing for commercial jingles.

"Telephone Man" and success
While singing some jingles in a Dallas–Fort Worth, Texas studio in early 1977, she caught the attention of former Bloodrock vocalist Jim Rutledge from Fort Worth, who introduced her to music producer Boomer Castleman. Wilson began recording for his BNA Records label and taped her self-composed song "Telephone Man" based on her brief affair with a Dallas telephone technician installing the phone in her new apartment there. 

Filled with suggestive lyrics and her breathy squealing voice, the song became a surprise hit single, climbing the UK Singles Chart to No. 6, spending ten weeks in the listings, as well as making it to No. 9 in Ireland and New Zealand and No. 18 on the US Billboard Hot 100 chart. It reached No. 42 in Australia, and was also a minor hit in Canada (No. 76).

It became a gold record, selling over one million copies in the U.S. alone. The song became a favorite on the "Dr. Demento Radio Show".  "Telephone Man" and "Telephone Line", ELO's song, were back-to-back on the Hot 100's top 40 for two non-consecutive weeks in the summer of 1977.

On the strength of the song's hit, she rapidly put together a full album of songs after quickly being signed with the GRT Records label and released her first and only album, First Take. Unfortunately, although the album contained two more released singles, a second novelty "Rub-A-Dub-Dub" and "Midnight In Memphis", it yielded no further hits, and after her novelty's appeal waned, she went back to singing jingles, modelling and song writing. She also continued to write more novelty songs, including "Peter The Meter Reader," "Dick The DJ", "Santa's Coming," and "My Valentine's Funny," but none of the songs matched the success of her first release. She became known as a "one-hit wonder".

Later years and death
After singing locally in Atlanta, Georgia for more than two decades and occasionally touring on novelty song circuits, in 1999 Meri Wilson released an updated version of "Telephone Man", called "Internet Man". It became a drive-time radio airplay song, which resulted in her getting a deal with Time-Warner Records.

Wilson died on December 28, 2002, at the age of 53, in a car accident on Georgia State Route 377 in Americus, Georgia, during an ice storm. Ansley Records released a self-titled album in 2002, which included all of her known recorded novelty songs.

Discography

Singles
"Telephone Man" (BNA 1977, GRT 1977)
"Rub-A-Dub-Dub" (GRT 1977)
"Midnight In Memphis" (GRT 1977)
"Peter The Meter Reader" (WMOT 1981)
"Dick The DJ" (198?)
"Santa's Coming" (198?)
"My Valentine's Funny" (198?)
"Internet Man" (GAMC 1999)

Albums
First Take (GRT 8023, 1977, LP, 8-Track, Cassette)
Meri Wilson: The World's Funniest Telephone Man's Lady (2001 Legend, CD)
Meri Wilson (2002 Ansley, CD) [Compilation]

References

External links
 

1949 births
2002 deaths
American women singer-songwriters
Musicians from Marietta, Georgia
Road incident deaths in Georgia (U.S. state)
20th-century American singers
20th-century American women singers
Singer-songwriters from Georgia (U.S. state)